Daci may refer to:

Nexhat Daci, speaker of Assembly of Kosovo from 2001 to 2006
Dacians, ancient Indo-European people who lived roughly in the territory of modern Romania and surrounding neighbors
DACI, a Direct Acoustic Cochlear Implant
DACI, a responsibility assignment matrix consisting of four roles; Driver, Approver, Contributor and Informed